= Burkina 24 =

Burkina Faso media

Burkina 24 (pronounced Burkina vingt-quatre) is a Burkina Faso news website. The site offers news and covers politics, business, entertainment, technology, fashion, culture, and local news. Burkina 24 was launched on June 1, 2011, in Montreal, Quebec, Canada by three young entrepreneurs from Burkina Faso's diaspora.

== Awards ==
- In 2012, Burkina 24 won the Gambré d'or, in the category of the best online news media.
- in 2013 AND 2014, Burkina 24won the "Pure Player" of the Galian . Burkina was 24 category winner releases online pure player of the 2014 edition of Galian. He thus won for the second time this award after 2013 edition.

Burkina 24also received the special prize of the Regulatory Authority for Electronic Communications and Postal IN 2014.
